Çavuşköy is a town in the Kastamonu Province of Turkey.  Located in what was once called Paphlagonia, The economy is primarily agricultural.

External links
RealTravel Information for Cavuskoy
Travelpost info for Cavuskoy

Towns in Turkey